Hunor and Magor were, according to Hungarian legend, the ancestors of the Huns and the Magyars. The legend was first promoted in Gesta Hunnorum et Hungarorum. The legend's aim in providing a common ancestry for the Huns and the Magyars was to suggest historical continuum of the Kingdom of Hungary with the Hun Empire. Magyars led by prince Árpád had conquered the area in the 890s. The territory had previously been held by Attila the Hun in the 5th century. The legend thus tried to prove that the Magyars were simply reclaiming their ancient homeland as descendants of Attila.  According to Simon of Kéza, Hunor and Magor were the sons of Ménrót, a mythical giant, who he partly identified with Nimrod of the Bible (the great-grandson of Noah).

The myth 
The brothers Hunor and Magor were the legendary forefathers of the Huns and the Hungarians, or Magyars, according to most Hungarian chronicles. Simon of Kéza's Gesta Hunnorum et Hungarorum, written in the 1280s, contains the first version of their legend. Other Hungarian chronicles wrote, the brothers were the sons either of Ménrót or of Magog, king of the Scythians. Their mother was Ménrót's wife, Eneth, whose name was derived from the Hungarian word for hind (old eneγ, now ünő), according to Simon of Kéza. Historians Zoltán Kordé and Gyula Kristó say that her name shows, the Hungarians once regarded a hind as their totemistic ancestor, but this pagan concept was reinterpreted after their conversion to Christianity in the 11th century.

The Chronicon Pictum makes Hunor and Magor sons of Iaphet (Japhet was the son of Noah in the Book of Genesis). Hunor and Magor, hunters like their father, were on a hunting trip when they saw their descendants multiplied and populated the nearby lands, founding the 108 clans of the Scythian nation. From them descended Attila the Hun and High Prince Álmos, the father of Árpád.

Influence

Political
The myth was also employed by later writers, most notably chief Justice and jurisconsult István Werbőczy, who used it to extol the Hungarian nobility in his highly influential collection of Hungarian customary law, the Tripartitum (completed 1514, first published 1517). According to Werbőczy, the Hungarians, as descendants of Hunor and Magor, were of 'Scythian' origin and subject to 'Scythian' law. "The Hungarians inherited their moral values and customs from the 'Scythians', who had once defeated even Darius and Alexander the Great. Their true vocation was war, which was the only activity that was noble enough to suit them." The nobles were free and equal; the peasants were the descendants of those who had been condemned for cowardice in battle and whose punishment had been commuted from execution to losing their social rank. Werbőczy thus used the Hunor and Magor myth to justify Hungarian serfdom. Werbőczy's ideas were eagerly adopted by the Hungarian nobility and became the charter of common law for three centuries.

The poorer smaller nobles (the gentry) particularly cherished their 'Scythian' identity. According to Engel:It made the nobility inclined to think in terms of historical fictions and to cherish illusions. They thought that they had the right to rule their subjects without having to meet any obligations. It also involved an extreme respect for traditions, and gave birth to what was an early form of 'nationalism'. The nobility's ideology overvalued everything that was, or was thought to be, ancient, and regarded everything that seemed strange or unusual with aversion or even hostility [...] The nobility also took delight in hearing about 'Scythian' values, for they imagined they recognised their own virtues in them. Among the petty nobility the ideal of martial simplicity must have become especially popular, for it made a virtue out of their misery and illiteracy."

Literary
János Arany retold the myth in his poem Rege a csodaszarvasról (Legend of the Miraculous Stag) as did Kate Seredy in her children's book The White Stag.

Notes

Sources

Primary sources

Simon of Kéza: The Deeds of the Hungarians (Edited and translated by László Veszprémy and Frank Schaer with a study by Jenő Szűcs) (1999). CEU Press. .

Secondary sources

See also
Gog and Magog
Lech, Czech and Rus
Romulus and Remus
Hengest and Horsa
Sarmatism (the belief that the Polish nobility were of Sarmatian descent)
Gothicismus (the belief that the Swedes were descended from the Goths)

History of the Hungarians
Hungarian literature
Japheth
Hungarian folklore
Hungarian prehistory
Sibling duos
Nimrod